Palanca is a commune in Bacău County, Western Moldavia, Romania. It is composed of five villages: Cădărești (Magyarcsügés), Ciugheș (Oláhcsügés), Pajiștea (Gyepece), Palanca and Popoiu. According to the 2002 census, the commune's inhabitants are 99.5% Romanians and 0.5% Hungarians; they are 60.3% Romanian Orthodox and 39.7% Roman Catholic.

References

Communes in Bacău County
Localities in Western Moldavia